Nikita Novikov (born 10 November 1989) is a Russian cyclist. The Russian Anti-Doping Agency has suspended for him two years from July 6, 2013, until June 6, 2015.

Palmares

Track
2007
 World Champion – Points race (Juniors)

Road
2011
1st Okolo Slovenska
1st stages 2 & 8
1st Tour des Pays de Savoie
1st Prologue
Stage 2 Giro della Valle d'Aosta

References

1989 births
Living people
Russian male cyclists
Doping cases in cycling
People from Vologodsky District
Sportspeople from Vologda Oblast